Juan Miranda González (born 19 January 2000) is a Spanish professional footballer who plays as a left-back for La Liga club Real Betis and the Spain national team.

Club career

Barcelona
Born in Olivares, Seville, Andalusia, Miranda joined Barcelona's youth setup in June 2014, from Real Betis. After progressing through the youth setup, he made his senior debut with the reserves on 19 August 2017, starting in a 2–1 away win against Real Valladolid in the Segunda División.

Miranda scored his first senior goal on 27 January 2018, netting the second in a 3–0 home win against Granada. On 11 December, he made his UEFA Champions League debut for the first team in a 1–1 draw against Tottenham Hotspur.

Loan to Schalke 04
On 30 August 2019, Miranda joined Bundesliga club FC Schalke 04 on a two-year loan deal. On 15 December 2019, he made his Bundesliga debut in a 1–0 home win against Eintracht Frankfurt when he came on for the injured Weston McKennie in the 13th minute. On 1 July 2020, he returned to Barcelona as the loan was ended early.

Loan to Betis
On 5 October 2020, Miranda joined La Liga side Real Betis on loan for the 2020–21 campaign.

Real Betis
On 1 June 2021, Barcelona announced that the clause in Miranda's contract to automatically extend it until 2023 would not triggered, and that and he would join Real Betis permanently once his loan spell ended. Barça will reserve 40% of the rights of any future sale, and a right to first refusal on re-signing Miranda.

On 23 April 2022, Miranda scored the winning goal in the penalty shootout for Real Betis in the 2022 Copa del Rey Final.

International career
Due to the isolation of some national team players following the positive COVID-19 test of Sergio Busquets, Spain's under-21 squad  were called up for the international friendly against Lithuania on 8 June 2021. Miranda made his senior debut in the match and scored as Spain won 4–0.

Career statistics

Club

International

Scores and results list Spain's goal tally first, score column indicates score after each Miranda goal.

Honours

Club
Barcelona Youth
UEFA Youth League: 2017–18

Barcelona
Supercopa de España: 2018

Real Betis
Copa del Rey: 2021–22

International
Spain U17
UEFA European Under-17 Championship: 2017

Spain U18
Mediterranean Games: 2018

Spain U19
UEFA European Under-19 Championship: 2019

Spain U23
Summer Olympic silver medal: 2020

References

External links

Profile at the Real Betis website

2000 births
Living people
People from Aljarafe
Sportspeople from the Province of Seville
Spanish footballers
Footballers from Andalusia
Association football defenders
La Liga players
Segunda División players
Segunda División B players
FC Barcelona Atlètic players
FC Barcelona players
Real Betis players
Bundesliga players
FC Schalke 04 players
Spain youth international footballers
Spain under-21 international footballers
Spain international footballers
Competitors at the 2018 Mediterranean Games
Mediterranean Games gold medalists for Spain
Mediterranean Games medalists in football
Spanish expatriate footballers
Spanish expatriate sportspeople in Germany
Expatriate footballers in Germany
Olympic footballers of Spain
Footballers at the 2020 Summer Olympics
Olympic medalists in football
Olympic silver medalists for Spain
Medalists at the 2020 Summer Olympics